Bob Woodruff (born in New York City) is an American country music singer and songwriter. Initially, he was a member of a country rock band called The Fields before beginning a career as a solo artist. He released four studio albums (1994's Dreams & Saturday Nights, 1997's Desire Road, 2011's The Lost Kerosene Tapes, 1999 and 2013's The Year We Tried to Kill the Pain) and has charted two singles on the Billboard country music charts, as well as a third on the RPM Country Tracks chart in Canada.

Woodruff's 1994 debut album Dreams & Saturday Nights was produced by Steve Fishell and included instrumentation from James Burton and Bernie Leadon. His second album included covers of songs by John Fogerty and Arthur Alexander. His latest album, The Year We Tried To Kill The Pain, was released in Europe in September 2013.

Discography

Albums

Singles

Music videos

References

1961 births
Asylum Records artists
American country singer-songwriters
American male singer-songwriters
Living people
Singers from New York City
Imprint Records artists
Country musicians from New York (state)
Singer-songwriters from New York (state)